Rebel Inc. is a strategy video game developed and released by Ndemic Creations for iOS in 2018. Later the game was ported to Android and Windows; the version of the game for personal computers was released under the name Rebel Inc: Escalation. The goal of the game is to stabilize a region of a country without letting a group of rebels take over the government.

Gameplay
The game is about maintaining order in a certain territory as well as balancing between the civilian and military aspects of stabilizing a region. The game features several governors that have different abilities such as the Warlord that helps strengthen the player's personal militia or the Economist that helps prioritize the player's income, but gives its entire budget annually. The game features multiplayer modes such as VS & Co-Op modes, as well as a Campaign mode. The game's Campaign mode, released in 2020, is about adapting insurgency and other tactics for counterinsurgents. The game has a collection of custom scenarios as well as a creator to make them. Each region of the game has different geographical conditions. The player has to invest in civic initiatives to improve their reputation and stabilize the country, although the more initiatives are taken, the more corruption and inflation increase. The regions of the game are inspired by the geography of Afghanistan. The game also requires the player to develop infrastructure as well as the creation of jobs in industries. Other game mechanics include investing in education, creating an army and building roads. The game contains a governance tab, in which governmental and financial anti-corruption measures can be created.

Development
The game was released on December 8, 2018 on iOS devices. A version of the game for Android devices was released on February 11, 2019. On October 15, 2019, a Windows PC version called Rebel Inc: Escalation was released. In an update of the game, version 1.8 added another region called "Opium Trail", which is about preventing opium trade. Some of the game simulations were inspired by the political situation in Afghanistan. In 2020, Ndemic Creations started a beta tester program for Android and iOS devices in order to bring the campaign mode to these devices.

Reception
Mike Holmes of Gamereactor gave Rebel Inc. a 9/10, "appreciating the depth, involvement, great pacing, varied gameplay, very interesting subject matter, and excellent value for money, but finding the winning strategies too easy to fall back on". Dick Page of Pocket Tactics gave it five out of five stars, finding it an "initially obtuse but ultimately highly rewarding spiritual sequel to one of the greatest mobile successes". He also gave it a 9/10 rating. In a 148.apps review Campbell Bird described the game as "fun, but if the player finds a strategy that works in the game, it is applicable in basically every part of the game".

Downloads
Along with Plague Inc., it was one of the most downloaded games on the App Store in 2020. It was also one of the most downloaded paid games on iOS devices in Hong Kong.

References

2018 video games
IOS games
Android (operating system) games
Windows games
Strategy video games
Indie video games
Video games developed in the United Kingdom
Government simulation video games
Fiction about rebellions
Counterinsurgency